Anita Singh Rajput  is an Indian politician from Uttar Pradesh.

Education
In 1999 she received a doctorate degree in agriculture from GB Pant University of Pant Nagar.

Political life
Initially she was basic label worker in public.  In 2017 she was elected a Member of the Legislative Assembly of Uttar Pradesh from Debai (Assembly constituency) as the Bharatiya Janta Party candidate. She got 1,11,807 votes in this election.

References

Living people
People from Bulandshahr
Uttar Pradesh MLAs 2017–2022
Bharatiya Janata Party politicians from Uttar Pradesh
Year of birth missing (living people)